Party of Democratic Action is a political party in Bosnia and Herzegovina. 

It also has the following eponymous offshoots in other countries:
 Party of Democratic Action of Croatia
 Party of Democratic Action (Kosovo)
 Party of Democratic Action of Sandžak, a Bosniak minority party in Serbia
 Party for Democratic Action - a similarly named Albanian minority party in Serbia
 Party of Democratic Action of Montenegro, a former party in Montenegro (1990-2002)
 Party of Democratic Action of Macedonia

See also
 Democratic Action Party (disambiguation)